Judo at the 2017 Summer Deaflympics in Samsun was held from 20 to 22 July 2017 at the Atatürk Sports Hall in Canik.

Medal summary

Medalists

Men's events

Women's events

Mixed events

See also
https://en.wikipedia.org/wiki/Judo_at_the_Deaflympics

References

External links
 Judo

2017 Summer Deaflympics
Deaflympics